Cape Walcott is a bold, ice-covered headland rising to 625 m on the north side of the entrance to Bertius Inlet, and forming the seaward extremity of Scripps Heights on the east coast of Palmer Land. Discovered by Sir Hubert Wilkins in 1928 and named by him for Frederic C. Walcott of the Council of the American Geographical Society.

Headlands of Palmer Land